Ryan Farrington (born c. 1985), known by his stage name Akouo (stylised in uppercase; pronounced ), previously known as Mynse, is an Australian electronic musician, producer and DJ. He is also a member of the hip hop duo Letters to the Sun with Coin Banks. He became the first Tasmanian-based act to perform at Splendour in the Grass in 2015. He has released one studio album: Outwit the Muscle (2008).

Early life
Ryan Farrington was born in 1985 in Launceston, Tasmania. He started playing guitar when he was 12, and had been a disc jockey in the underground hip-hip scene of Tasmania since 2003. He has performed under many different names, until he came up with his current name 'Akouo', he stated that its means "to hear" or "to listen" in Greek.

Music career

1990s–2006: Early years and Altrueism
Farrington's music career began in the late 1990s where he played as an amateur guitarist in several bands throughout his hometown of Launceston. In 2003, he started performing as a disc jockey at local houses parties. A year later, he joined Launceston local MCs Azrael and Ethics and formed the hip hop group known as Altrueism where he performed under the alias "Mynse". Throughout 2005, the group toured with notable hip hop artists including: Bliss n Eso, Phrase, Heads of State, Tom Thum, among others. After releasing some limited-run demos and appearing on Alleyway Crawlerz Mixtapes (Volumes 1 & 2), the group parted ways in early-2006.

2007–2013: Solo career and Letters to the Sun
Still performing under the name "Mynse", Farrington begun pursuing a solo-career, releasing The Mynstrual Cycle, a self produced street-EP in March 2007 under his own label, Altrueistic Recordings. The EP was described as containing "slightly off-center/deep tunes to hyped beats." To celebrate the EPs launch, Mynse performed it at the James Hotel in Launceston. After its release he performed solo in Tasmania and Victoria alongside artists such as Pegz, Funkoars, Vents, Bias B, Muph & Plutonic, and Bigfoot. These performances solidified his name as one of Tasmania's hardest working hip hop acts.

In 2008, Ryan started concentrating more on his DJing career. On 8 November, he released his debut hip hop album Outwit the Muscle under his new alias 'Akouo'. The album featured several prominent underground MCs like Javs, Thorts, Dunn D, and Phatchance. The album was featured on Triple J as their Feature Album of the Week, and the single "Lazy Days" received high rotation on the station. On 1 September 2010, Akouo collaborated with American MC Javs once more, and released the EP Double Helix.

In 2011, Akouo and Perth rapper Coin joined together and formed Letters to the Sun, they released a free promo-EP entitled Appetizers on 4 January 2012. In August, the duo released a single "Mile High Club" featuring vocals from Perth singer-songwriter Donovan de Souza, it would later be included on their then-upcoming self-titled album.

On 10 January 2013, Akouo's solo EP Above & Beyond was released. On 13 February, Akouo remixed "Terms and Conditions" by Chet Faker. On 22 March, they released their eponymous debut album. On 6 April, Flume's track "Bring You Down" featuring George Maple was remixed by Akouo. Akouo released another remix on 15 May, of "A Walk" by Tycho. Akouo's next solo EP, Hurcha, was released on 9 June. Akouo also began performing as a completely solo act in June. On 20 July, he remixed "Listen to Soul, Listen to Blues" by Safia.

2014–2018: Mesa and Carbon
On 6 January 2014, he remixed Childish Gambino's track "3005", after which it and his remix of Flume's "Bring You Down" made his popularity grow after they gained traction and together receiving over 1,000,000 views across YouTube, SoundCloud and Spotify. Akouo released his single "Last Time" in February, as a teaser for his then upcoming EP, an accompanying music video was also released. In May, Akouo performed as an opening act for Safia. On 12 June, Akouo released his EP Mesa under the Die High Records label, it later peaked at No. 1 on the Australian iTunes Charts a week after. On 10 July, he remixed "Return to" by #1 Dads featuring Tom Snowden. On 8 October, he released a remix of "Paradise Awaits" by Zhu. On 15 October, he then made a remix of "Shiner" by Indian Summer featuring Ginger & The Ghost. On 27 November, he released a remix of "Unmissable" by Gorgon City.

On 13 January 2015, he released his single "Pieces". His single "All They Do" featuring Monsoonsiren and Mayo was later released on 26 January. On 29 May, he released a remix of "Xhampagne" by Shy Girls featuring Antwon. In July, he then became the first Tasmanian act to play at Splendour in the Grass. On 13 October, he remixed "Take it Slow" by Kultur featuring Blest Jones.

On 11 February 2016, Akouo released his single "Goldmine". On 1 March, he released a remix of "Weak" by Wet. On 18 March, Akouo released the single "Giving into You" featuring guest vocal by Ashibah. On 23 March, a remix of "Helix 2.0" by Robokid, AObeats & Manila Killa featuring Blaise Railey was released. On 1 April, Akouo released a remix of "Vampire" by Lazyboy Empire.

On 4 May 2017, Akouo released his single "Feel That" featuring vocals from Montaigne, alongside an accompanying music video. A month later, he announced a 15-date tour across Australia and New Zealand that August and September to promote the new single.

On 29 June 2018, Akouo remixed "Faded Away" by Sweater Beats featuring Icona Pop. On 8 July, he released the single "Painted On" featuring vocals from La'vel. On 12 July, he collaborated with Melbourne musician Lanks on the single "Yours", Akouo provided the beat for the track. He also released a remix of "Winnebago" by Gryffin featuring Quinn XCII and Daniel Wilson. The next day Akouo released his EP, entitled Carbon under Trench Records' label, it included the single "Painted On".

2018–present: "So Long"
A new single entitled "So Long" was released on 12 October. On 29 December, Akouo performed at the Falls Festival in Marion Bay, Tasmania.

Discography

Studio albums

Collaborative albums

Extended plays

Singles
As lead artist

As featured artist

Remixes

Music videos

References

1980s births
Living people
20th-century Australian musicians
21st-century Australian musicians
Australian DJs
Australian electronic musicians
Australian dance musicians
Australian record producers
Remixers
Musicians from Tasmania
People from Launceston, Tasmania
Electronic dance music DJs